Save This Christmas for Me is the tenth studio album and first Christmas album by Australian-born Irish singer and composer Johnny Logan, released in Denmark in November 2001.

Track listing

Charts

References

Johnny Logan (singer) albums
2001 albums
2001 Christmas albums